is the fourth single by Japanese singer Ryōko Shinohara, released on July 21, 1994, by Epic Records/Sony Music Entertainment Japan under the Tokyo Performance Doll label Cha-Dance. Written and produced by Tetsuya Komuro, the song was used in the Japanese release of the 1994 anime film Street Fighter II: The Animated Movie during the scene where Ryu and Ken Masters team up to fight Vega/M. Bison. The B-side is "Good Luck", which was also featured in the film as the ending theme.

The single was Shinohara's breakthrough hit, staying at No. 1 on Oricon's singles chart for two weeks and peaking at No. 3 on Oricon's year-ending singles chart. It also made Shinohara the first female artist in Japan to sell two million singles. The song received the Excellence Award and the Arrangement Award at the 36th Japan Record Awards, the Wired Music Excellence Award at the 27th Japan Cable Awards, and the Best 5 Singles Award at the Japan Gold Disc Awards. Shinohara performed the song on the 45th and the 73rd Kōhaku Uta Gassen.

In 2022, Shinohara and Komuro reunited to re-record the song as the Japanese image song for Street Fighter 6.

Track listing
All music is composed and arranged by Tetsuya Komuro.

Chart position

Weekly charts

Year-end charts

Certifications

Cover versions 
 Purple Days covered the song as the B-side of their 2010 single "Tsuyokunare".
 m.o.v.e covered the song on their 2010 album anim.o.v.e 02.
 MAX covered the song on their 2010 cover album Be MAX.
 AAA covered the song as the B-side of the Jacket C release of their 2011 single "Daiji na Koto".
 You Kikkawa covered the song on her 2012 cover album Vocalist?.
 Hatsune Miku covered the song on the 2012 compilation album Tetsuya Komuro Meets Vocaloid.
 Tomomi Kahara covered the song on her 2014 cover album Memories -Kahara Covers-.
 Machico covered the song on her 2014 album Colors.
 Minami Tsuda covered the song on the bonus CD of the limited edition DVD/Blu-ray Vol. 2 release of the 2015 anime series Classroom Crisis.
 May'n covered the song in 2017 for the Nintendo Switch game Ultra Street Fighter II: The Final Challengers.
 Raychell (of Raise A Suilen) covered the song for the 2020 game BanG Dream! Girls Band Party!.

References

External links 
 
 
 

1994 singles
1994 songs
Anime songs
Japanese-language songs
Songs written by Tetsuya Komuro
Oricon Weekly number-one singles
Sony Music Entertainment Japan singles